Georgios Fekkas (born on 24 May 2001) is a Greek professional footballer who plays as an attacking midfielder for Fostiras.

Club career

Fekkas made his professional debut in the Super League U-17 for Olympiacos on 9 September 2017 in a game against Levadiakos F.C. winning 3-0 and playing the full match. As he signed his professional contract for Olympiacos on 19 September 2017, scouting from foreign clubs picked up on that and they were very interested in this past year. His team currently sits at the top of the football table, beating their eternal rivals Panathinaikos F.C for just a few points away. He is considered by many to be one of the best players Olympiacos has ever purchased. After winning the 2015-2016 with the U-15, without any hesitation and any regrets from the Olympiacos staff, Fekkas immediately jumped up to his now U-17 team. Saying this he had with U-15 20 appearances and 4 goals and currently with the U-17 team he has 18 appearances 7 goals, which is surprisingly a lot for an attacking midfielder.

International career

Fekkas made his international debut for the Greece national under-17 football team on  18 October 2017 substituting Dimitrios Serpezis in the 65th minute for Greece over a win against Norway for 1-0. His second appearance for the under-17s was against Gibraltar over a wonderful win for Greece ending up in a 6-0. He played full match despite scoring 0 goals. He will be playing on the UEFA Under-17 EURO 2018, as a primary choice for the coach.

References

2001 births
Living people
Olympiacos F.C. players
Association football midfielders
Doxa Vyronas F.C. players
Footballers from Athens
Greek footballers